Myśliborzyce  is a village in the administrative district of Gmina Brudzeń Duży, within Płock County, Masovian Voivodeship, in east-central Poland.

References

Villages in Płock County